Wyoming Highway 156 (WYO 156) is a  Wyoming State Road located in central Goshen County west of Torrington and south of Lingle.

Route description
Wyoming Highway 156 is an "L" shaped route that runs generally east-west between Lingle and Torrington. Highway 156 begins it western terminus at US 26/US 85 (Main Street) in Lingle, and from there WYO 156 proceeds due south as the western section runs north-south. The eastern terminus of Wyoming Highway 157 is intersected a just under two-tenths of a miles. WYO 156 travels south, crossing the North Platte River at approximately 2 miles. After crossing the river, WYO 156 begins to head in a more east-west direction and serves the southern bank of the North Platte River. Highway 156 again turns south, but then turns back east, and stays in an east-west direction for the remainder of its routing. WYO 156 comes to its eastern end at US 85/WYO 92 (Main Street) in the city of Torrington, in an area called South Torrington, just north of the US 85/WYO 154 junction.

Mileposts increase from east to west along WYO 156.

Major intersections

References

Official 2003 State Highway Map of Wyoming

External links 

Wyoming State Routes 100-199
WYO 156 - US 85/WYO 92 to WYO 157
WYO 156 - WYO 157 to US 26/US 85

Transportation in Goshen County, Wyoming
156